Alarma Records was an imprint of Newpax Records and Frontline Records. Alarma! Records and Tapes was formed in 1983 by the band Daniel Amos with musician Tom Howard for the release of their Doppelgänger album. The name of the label comes from the band's 1981 album ¡Alarma!.

It was reformed by the Frontline Music Group in the late 1980s.

Artists 

 afewloosescrews
 Altar Boys
 Daniel Amos
 Dead Artist Syndrome
 Dr. Edward Daniel Taylor
 Edin-Ådahl
 Rick Elias
 Every Day Life
 Hoglund Band
 Jacob's Trouble
 Lifesavers
 Mad at the World
 Michael Knott
 Mortal
 Poor Old Lu
 Scaterd Few
 Shades of Blue
 The Swirling Eddies
 Terry Scott Taylor
 White Frogs
 Walk on Water
 David Zaffiro

See also 

 Intense Records
 List of record labels

References 

Christian record labels
American independent record labels
Record labels established in 1983
Record labels established in 1988